Crazy Eddie was a consumer electronics chain in the Northeastern United States. The chain was started in 1971 in Brooklyn, New York, by businessmen Eddie and Sam M. Antar, and was previously named ERS Electronics (ERS stood for Eddie, Rose and Sam; Rose and Sam were Eddie's parents). The chain rose to prominence throughout the Tri-State area (New York-New Jersey-Connecticut) as much for its prices as for its memorable radio and television commercials, featuring a frenetic, "crazy" character played by radio DJ Jerry Carroll (who copied most of his shtick from early TV commercial pioneer, used car and electronics salesman Earl "Madman" Muntz). At its peak, Crazy Eddie had 43 stores in four states and reported more than $300 million in sales.

Almost from the beginning, Crazy Eddie engaged in fraudulent business practices, including under-reporting income, skimming sales taxes, and paying employees off the books. These practices, in conjunction with aggressive sales tactics, enabled Crazy Eddie to significantly undercut competitors and grow rapidly. During the process of going public, Crazy Eddie continued to engage in fraud, over-reporting profits, inflating inventory and duping auditors. Unable to sustain his fraudulent business practices, co-founder Eddie Antar cashed in millions of dollars' worth of stock and resigned from the company in December 1986. Crazy Eddie's board of directors approved the sale of the company in November 1987. The entire Antar family was immediately removed from the business. The new owners quickly discovered the true extent of the Antar family's fraud, but were unable to turn around Crazy Eddie's quickly declining fortunes. In 1989, the company filed for bankruptcy and was liquidated.

In February 1987, the United States Attorney's Office for the District of New Jersey commenced a federal grand jury investigation into the financial activities of Crazy Eddie. In September of that year, the United States Securities and Exchange Commission initiated an investigation into alleged violations of federal securities laws by certain Crazy Eddie officers and employees. Eddie Antar was eventually charged with a series of crimes. Antar fled to Israel in February 1990, but was returned to the United States in January 1993 to stand trial. His 1993 conviction on fraud charges was overturned, but he eventually pleaded guilty in 1996. In 1997, Antar was sentenced to eight years in prison and was subject to numerous fines. He was released from prison in 1999, and died in 2016.

Beginnings
Eddie Antar's grandparents, Murad and Tera Antar, who were Syrian Jews, relocated to Brooklyn, New York from Aleppo, Syria. Murad and Tera worked in their market stalls alongside Arabs, including Egyptians, other Syrians, as well as Turks. Eddie's father Sam Antar was a retailer, and it was no surprise to the family that Eddie also became a retailer.

The predecessor to Crazy Eddie was a consumer electronics shop called Sight And Sound. It was a property of ERS Electronics, a company owned by Sam M. Antar, his son Eddie Antar, and Eddie's cousin Ronnie Gindi. Sight And Sound, located on Kings Highway in Brooklyn, began operation in 1969 and offered electronics at regular prices. Due to his aggressive sales techniques, Eddie quickly became known as "Crazy Eddie", but within eighteen months the shop (as well as Eddie and Ronnie) was nearly bankrupt. Eddie bought out Gindi's one-third ownership stake of Sight And Sound, and Sam M. Antar retained his one-third stake but left the day-to-day operations to Eddie. In 1971, the Sight And Sound store on Kings Highway was renamed Crazy Eddie. Eddie continued his sales tactics with the renamed Crazy Eddie shop, but this time was successful. Eventually, Eddie closed that location and relocated the business to a bigger shop, just a few blocks from Sight And Sound's old location. In 1973, Antar opened the second Crazy Eddie location in Syosset, New York. A third followed during 1975, located in Greenwich Village. That year, Antar established a corporate main office on Coney Island Avenue in Brooklyn. By 1977, two more stores had been opened, with one located on East Fordham Road in The Bronx and the other being the first Crazy Eddie location in New Jersey, located on the southbound side of Route 17 in Paramus. By 1981, Crazy Eddie was operating ten locations, one of which was a new flagship location located on East 57th Street on Manhattan’s Upper East Side.

Advertising

Crazy Eddie stores were famous in the New York metro area for their advertisements, which featured Jerry Carroll as the star. The relationship between the two sides began in 1972, when Carroll was a radio disc jockey known as “Dr. Jerry” at WPIX-FM. Antar had paid for an on-air ad and Carroll read the chain's slogan “his prices are insane” in an exaggerated and frenetic manner. When Antar heard Carroll's delivery, he telephoned the radio station and told Carroll to say the line the same way every time he read it.

In 1975, Carroll began appearing in television commercials for Crazy Eddie. For most of the next fifteen years Carroll performed commercials in the same frenetic manner he had for radio. One of his more memorable promotions was for Crazy Eddie's annual "Christmas in August" sale, where he would dress in a Santa suit and do the commercial while stagehands threw fake snowballs at him. Carroll also had a trademark look in each commercial, wearing a blue suit with a lighter blue turtleneck shirt in almost all of his appearances (even during later years). Carroll even appeared in a Spanish-language Crazy Eddie advertisement, although he did not have a speaking role; instead, his appearance consisted of him holding a radio to his ear as he walked behind the commercial's spokesman, stopping only to wave at the camera several times.

During the 1980s, more than 7,500 unique radio and television ads were broadcast in the tri-state area. Carroll's acting became so identified with the company that many people thought he was actually Crazy Eddie; Crazy Eddie even made a commercial to this effect with Carroll as a Superman-styled superhero named Crazy Eddie. Warner Communications, the parent company of the distributor of the Superman movie series, found the commercial to be problematic and sued the chain trying to stop it. At the time, Warner also was the parent company of the Atari video game company, and its largest customer for systems and games was Crazy Eddie. Therefore, in retaliation for the lawsuit, Eddie said that if Warner was going to sue for the commercial, he would stop selling Atari products in his stores. The suit was eventually settled.

The commercials were so memorable that HBO's news parody series Not Necessarily the News created a parody television commercial featuring a caricature of Oliver North (from the infamous Iran–Contra affair), known as "Crazy Ollie", selling used weapons at bargain prices. An early Eddie's commercial parody appeared on NBC's Saturday Night Live on January 22, 1977, in the Dan Aykroyd creation, "Crazy Ernie". Carroll and the commercials became significantly cultural during the 1980s, with the commercials sometimes appearing in the background of contemporary motion pictures. An example is the frightening first sight of a television receiver with a typical Jerry Carroll commercial on screen by Daryl Hannah's mermaid character in Ron Howard's 1984 comedy Splash.

Carroll's presence was ubiquitous enough that 
the makers of Yoplait yogurt signed him to do a commercial for their product in 1985. Playing up his character and the Crazy Eddie chain, he was dressed in his usual blue sport coat and light blue turtleneck shirt and standing among racks of electronic equipment while sampling the company's product and then singing its praises in French.

Crazy Eddie also was known to have in-store appearances by notable rock acts, including all four members of Queen in their Manhattan location on Tuesday, July 27, 1982 (prior to their performance that evening at Madison Square Garden).

Fraud
Almost from the beginning, Crazy Eddie's management engaged in various forms of fraud. The Antars deliberately falsified their books to reduce (or eliminate) their taxable income. They also paid employees off the books, and regularly skimmed thousands of dollars (in cash) earned at the shops. For every $5 Crazy Eddie reported as income, $1 was taken by the Antars. In 1979, the Antars began depositing much of this money—hundreds of thousands of dollars—in Israeli bank accounts. The Antar family skimmed an estimated $3 to $4 million per year at the height of their fraud. In one offshore bank account, the family deposited more than $6 million between 1980 and 1983.

By 1983, it was becoming more and more difficult to hide the millions of illicit dollars. The Antars decided that the way to cover up their growing fraud was to take the company public. In preparation, Eddie initiated a scheme in 1979 to skim less each year. Since more income was actually being reported, this had the effect of showing drastically increasing profit margins. While the company's actual profits (taking into account skimmed profits) from 1980 to 1983 increased approximately 13%, reported profits increased nearly 171%.

Despite the misgivings of people closely associated with Crazy Eddie, the company held its initial public offering on September 13, 1984 (former symbol: CRZY). Shares of the company sold initially for $8. By early 1986, Crazy Eddie stock was trading at more than $75 per share (split adjusted).

Eddie recruited his cousin, Sam E. Antar (known as Sammy), to assist the company with its fraud. Sammy earned a degree in accounting in 1980, and served his apprenticeship with Penn and Horowitz, Crazy Eddie's auditor. In 1986, he was named chief financial officer of the company. Sammy was informed that there was a $3 million deficit from the previous year's inventory fraud that needed to be hidden. Additionally, he was instructed to find ways to show a 10% growth in sales. One of Sammy's major schemes was a money laundering operation later known as the Panama Pump—money that the Antars had deposited in Israeli banks was transferred to bank accounts in Panama. These accounts, opened using false names, then drafted payments to Crazy Eddie. This money was largely used to inflate same-store sales totals for the company.

As a public company, Eddie, Sammy, and others engaged in increasing amounts of inventory fraud to increase reported profits and inflate the value of Crazy Eddie stock. For the fiscal year ended March 1, 1985, Crazy Eddie falsified inventories by $3 million. The next fiscal year, that amount increased to between $10 and $12 million.

Eventual downfall
Only months after Crazy Eddie's IPO, Antar's marriage to his wife, Debbie, became unstable as a result of frequent arguments. He then commenced an affair with another, younger woman, also named Debbie. The trysting pair were caught by Eddie's wife and sister on New Year's Eve 1984. Crazy Eddie's troubles began almost immediately afterward; the scam had relied extensively on family members helping keep the appearance that it was an immensely successful company.

By 1987, Sammy Antar's goal was no longer to show greater profitability, but rather to disguise previous frauds. During fiscal year 1987, they falsified inventories between $22.5 and $28 million. In addition, Crazy Eddie booked $20 million in phony debit memos or charge backs to vendors that reduced accounts payable.

As the company's fraud became more difficult to disguise, the public perception of Crazy Eddie as a commercial success began to change. By October 1986, the company's stock value had decreased to $17.50 per share. During December, Eddie announced his resignation as president and CEO. In April 1987, it was announced that Eddie had in fact retained his role as president but had dismissed, among others, his father Sam M. Antar. But by then Eddie Antar had already cashed out his share of Crazy Eddie stock, worth between $25 million and $30 million.

By the spring of 1987, the company's stock cost less than $10 a share. Additionally, earnings decreased 20% from the previous year. The franchise did show a 34% sales increase, but this was mainly the result of 13 new store openings. In May 1987, Eddie began proceedings to make the company a privately held company again, seeking out Canadian investment banker Samuel Belzberg as a partner.

As this was going on, another electronics discounter entered the picture and started buying up shares in Crazy Eddie. This man was Elias Zinn, who was based in Houston and was running his own business across Texas. Zinn eventually partnered with management consultant Victor Palmieri's backing to purchase $17.5 million worth of Crazy Eddie stock, which represented 7.5% of the outstanding shares. This would eventually result in Zinn and Palmieri ended up with the controlling interest in the company, which enabled them to initiate a hostile takeover. 

Once rumors of a takeover started, financial analysts began to examine more closely Crazy Eddie's financial situation. What they discovered was that while most stockholders of the company had lost money since 1984, Eddie had sold 6.5 million shares worth $74 million. A flurry of stockholder lawsuits were filed against the Antar family.

Eddie and Sammy Antar briefly attempted to counter-offer Zinn's takeover, but Zinn quickly topped their funds. The Antars' bid was ended, and Zinn became the new owner of Crazy Eddie on November 6, 1987. He immediately dismissed the rest of the Antar family from any important jobs. When Palmieri's financial analysts completed their preliminary audit a few weeks after the takeover, they estimated that Crazy Eddie's inventory was short by $40 to $50 million. The final figure was $80 million.

By June 1988, Crazy Eddie's suppliers were demanding the liquidation of the company, so they could recover money owed to them; in 1989 they got their wish. The closing of Crazy Eddie began in March 1989, as the company shuttered 17 of its 43 stores. On June 6, 1989, Crazy Eddie was served with a petition by five of its creditors, who had not been paid a total of $860,000 they were owed, which sought to have the company forced into bankruptcy. The company originally planned to fight the petition and file for dismissal, but 15 days later Crazy Eddie voluntarily filed for Chapter 11 bankruptcy protection. Company president and CEO Peter Martosella cited problems created by the creditors' position (which he termed "ill-advised"), but said business would be conducted as usual at the remaining 26 stores and that Crazy Eddie was still a strong franchise. The company vowed to stay in business, but, despite Martosella's assertions, Crazy Eddie continued to falter. By the autumn of 1989, the chain was down to eighteen remaining locations and sales were continuing to decrease and stores were unable to keep items stocked due to lack of supplier interest in the company.

Finally, on October 2, 1989, Crazy Eddie’s bankruptcy was converted from Chapter 11 to Chapter 7, and the company began a total liquidation immediately thereafter. By the end of November 1989, the last eighteen Crazy Eddie stores were shuttered and the chain, which only five years earlier had been one of the more lucrative retail chains in the United States, had ceased to exist.

Legal battles
In the meantime, a longtime Crazy Eddie associate named Arnie Spindler, who quit the company after Eddie dismissed his father Sam, brothers Allen and Mitchell and others after a family dispute, had provided investigators with information concerning Crazy Eddie's fraudulent business practices. Spindler implicated Eddie and Sammy, but stated the rest of the family was innocent, though subpoenas were served to the entire Antar family.

Based on information gathered during its investigation, the SEC charged Eddie Antar with securities fraud and illegal insider trading on September 6, 1989. In January 1990, a Federal district judge ordered Antar to repatriate more than $50 million he had transferred illegally to Israel. He was also ordered to appear in court to explain what had happened with the money. When he failed to appear, an arrest warrant was issued. Eddie surrendered to U.S. Marshals a week later, but was released and ordered to appear at a second hearing. When he failed to appear at that hearing, a second arrest warrant was issued and his assets were frozen.

Eddie fled to Israel using a fake passport and the alias David Jacob Levi Cohen, and purchased a townhouse in the city of Yavne. After Eddie fled the country, Sammy offered to testify for Federal prosecutors in exchange for immunity. Sammy pleaded guilty to three felonies. He avoided jail time in exchange for his testimony, however, and was instead sentenced to six months of house arrest, 1,200 hours of community service, three years of probation, and was levied more than $10,000 in fines. As of 2009, Sammy was an adviser for government agencies and businesses investigating fraud.

Eddie was arrested in June 1992 on federal racketeering conspiracy charges and was extradited to the United States in January 1993. He pleaded not guilty and his trial began in June 1993, and was prosecuted jointly by U.S. Attorneys Paul Weissman and Michael Chertoff. On July 20, Eddie was found guilty of seventeen counts of fraud. His brother, Mitchell, was found guilty of three counts, and acquitted on two. Eddie was sentenced to 12½ years in prison. The Antars' lawyers immediately filed an appeal, which succeeded in April 1995 when a federal appeals panel agreed with their contention that the judge presiding over their trial was biased toward their clients. Chertoff, calling Eddie "the Darth Vader of capitalism", vowed to begin a new trial.

Eddie Antar eventually pleaded guilty to federal fraud charges in May 1996. In February 1997, he was sentenced to eight years in prison. He was also ordered to pay more than $150 million in fines, in addition to the more than $1 billion in judgments against him resulting from various civil suits. Efforts to recover additional money from the Antar family on behalf of defrauded stockholders were completed in 2012.

Aftermath
Soon after the chain closed in 1989, a New Jersey-based investment group led by Alex Adjmi bought the rights to the Crazy Eddie trademark and announced in January 1990 that it had purchased the leases on Crazy Eddie's original location in Brooklyn and another in East Brunswick, New Jersey. The intent of the Adjmi group was to reopen the chain, but nothing ever came of the attempt.

In 1998, the grandchildren of Eddie, Allen and Mitchell Antar, revived the chain with a shop in Wayne, New Jersey, and as an online Internet venture, crazyeddieonline.com. The revived company retained the slogan "His prices are insane" and re-hired Jerry Carroll, who by this time had founded his own advertising agency, as spokesman. Despite plans to expand the chain to a potential 10 stores, the new Crazy Eddie did not expand beyond the Wayne store and in 1999 the only shop of the revived chain closed.

Eddie returned to the company in 2001, which by this time had been doing business solely as an Internet and buy-by-telephone business for more than a year. He reinitiated the Web site as crazyeddie.com and once again hired Jerry Carroll to do its advertising. By 2004, crazyeddie.com had disappeared again, and after a brief attempt to revive the online retailer in 2005, Crazy Eddie ceased to exist once again. The Crazy Eddie trademark and associated intellectual property were then acquired by Texas-based company Trident Growth Fund. In July 2006, Trident attempted to auction the brand and the domain name crazyeddie.com on eBay, but the reserve price was not met.

On March 3, 2009, it was announced that Brooklyn-based businessman Jack Gemal had bought the rights to the Crazy Eddie name and quickly began a new online Crazy Eddie venture at pricesareinsane.com. Gemal was also reported to be scouting retail space for new Crazy Eddie retail locations, stating that he wanted to open 50 locations during the next two years. This online venture performed business in the same manner as Crazy Eddie's other online stores, selling appliances and other electronics through the Internet. However, Gemal was never able to find the retail space he sought to reinitiate the Crazy Eddie store chain, and in 2012, the online business ended. The pricesareinsane.com site no longer exists, and as of 2018, the Crazy Eddie trademark is listed as abandoned.

In October 2020, Jerry Carroll passed away after suffering from cardiac issues for many years. Writer Gary Weiss, in doing research for a book he was writing about the rise and fall of Crazy Eddie, learned that Carroll's death had not been publicized, despite how ubiquitous a presence he was while serving as spokesman for Crazy Eddie.

Death of Eddie Antar
On September 10, 2016, Eddie Antar died at the age of 68. A funeral home in Ocean Township, New Jersey confirmed the death. Although Antar had been suffering from liver cancer, an official cause was not given. CNBC Commentator and journalist Herb Greenberg remarked that Antar's death was the "end of an era".

2022 book
On August 23, 2022, a book detailing the rise and fall of Crazy Eddie was released. Titled Retail Gangster and written by journalist Gary Weiss, the book chronicles, in significant detail, how Eddie Antar was able to build his business into one of the most profitable in the country and the illicit means he employed.

References

Further reading
 Schulman, Michael. "Remembering Crazy Eddie: His Prices Were Insane". The New Yorker, September 17, 2016.
 Weiss, Gary. Retail Gangster: The Insane, Real-Life Story of Crazy Eddie. Hachette, 2022.

External links

Sam Antar's 'Crazy Eddie' history page
CE Commercials

American companies established in 1971
Retail companies established in 1971
Retail companies established in 1998
Retail companies established in 2009
Defunct retail companies of the United States
Defunct consumer electronics retailers in the United States
Consumer electronics retailers in the United States
Corporate scandals
Corporate crime
Companies that filed for Chapter 11 bankruptcy in 1989
Companies that have filed for Chapter 7 bankruptcy
Retail companies disestablished in 1989
Retail companies disestablished in 2005
Retail companies disestablished in 2012
Companies based in New York City
Companies based in Passaic County, New Jersey
Re-established companies
1971 establishments in New York City
1989 disestablishments in New York (state)
1980s initial public offerings